Gorgoniidae is a family of soft corals, a member of the subclass Octocorallia in the phylum Cnidaria. Nearly all the genera and species are native to the east and west coasts of America.

Characteristics
Originally the members of the family Gorgoniidae included a much wider range of genera than it does now and was used for all of the horny Octocorallia. Now it is restricted to those species where the "calcareous spicules are less than 0.3 mm. in length, sculptured with regularly disposed girdles of complicated tubercles ('warts'), the anthocodiae are relatively unarmed, at most with but a few characteristically shaped flat rods en chevron beneath each tentacle, the horny axial cylinder is weakly loculated if at all, and is perforated by a relatively narrow, chambered central chord, and in which the branchlets are usually quite slender, with a thin cortex."

The polyps are retractable and the stems have an axis of the protein gorgonin surrounding a narrow, hollow, cross-chambered central core. Molecular phylogenetic analyses undertaken suggest that the family is polyphyletic.

The main feature which separates the members of the different genera is the degree and type of spiculation. Other diagnostic features include the pattern of branching and the morphology of the whole colony. There is an increase in complexity from unbranched whip forms, open branched forms, reticulate forms and the leafy frond forms which include by Phyllogorgia and Phycogorgia.

Many species of gorgoniids are native to warm waters around the Atlantic and Pacific coasts of America. Some genera, including Lophogorgia, Leptogorgia and Eunicella, have a more widespread distribution including the temperate eastern Atlantic, the Mediterranean Sea. Certain species have strange canoe-shaped spicules and these are all found in the Caribbean Sea.

Genera
The World Register of Marine Species list the following genera:
Genus Adelogorgia Bayer, 1958
Genus Antillogorgia Bayer, 1951
Genus Eugorgia Verrill, 1868
Genus Eunicella Verrill, 1869
Genus Filigorgia Stiasny, 1937
Genus Gorgonia Linnaeus, 1758
Genus Guaiagorgia Grasshoff & Alderslade, 1997
Genus Hicksonella Nutting, 1910
Genus Leptogorgia Milne-Edwards, 1857
Genus Olindagorgia Bayer, 1981
Genus Pacifigorgia Bayer, 1951
Genus Phycogorgia Milne Edwards & Haime, 1850
Genus Phyllogorgia Milne Edwards & Haime, 1850
Genus Pinnigorgia Grasshoff & Alderslade, 1997
Genus Pseudopterogorgia Kükenthal, 1919
Genus Pterogorgia Ehrenberg, 1834
Genus Rumphella Bayer, 1955 
Genus Tobagogorgia Sanchez, 2007

References

 
Holaxonia
Cnidarian families